Werther is an opera (drame lyrique) in four acts by Jules Massenet to a French libretto by Édouard Blau, Paul Milliet and Georges Hartmann (who used the pseudonym Henri Grémont). It is loosely based on Goethe's epistolary novel The Sorrows of Young Werther, which was based both on fact and on Goethe's own early life. Earlier examples of operas using the story were made by Kreutzer (1792) and Pucitta (1802).

Performance history
Massenet started composing Werther in 1885, completing it in 1887. He submitted it to Léon Carvalho, the director of the Paris Opéra-Comique, that year, but Carvalho declined to accept it on the grounds that the scenario was too serious. With the disruption of the fire at the Opéra-Comique and Massenet's work on other operatic projects (especially Esclarmonde), it was put to one side, until the Vienna Opera, pleased with the success of Manon, asked the composer for a new work. Werther received its premiere on 16 February 1892 (in a German version translated by Max Kalbeck) at the Imperial Theatre Hofoper in Vienna.

The French-language premiere followed in Geneva on 27 December 1892. The first performance in France was given by the Opéra-Comique at the Théâtre Lyrique on the Place du Châtelet in Paris on 16 January 1893, with Marie Delna as Charlotte and Guillaume Ibos in the title role, conducted by Jules Danbé, but was not immediately successful.

Werther entered the repertoire at the Opéra-Comique in 1903 in a production supervised by Albert Carré, and over the next half-century the opera was performed over 1,100 times there, Léon Beyle becoming a distinguished interpreter of Werther.

The United States premiere with the Metropolitan Opera took place in Chicago on 29 March 1894 and then in the company's main house in New York City three weeks later. The UK premiere was a one-off performance at Covent Garden, London, on 11 June 1894 with Emma Eames as Charlotte, Sigrid Arnoldson as Sophie, and Jean de Reszke in the title role.

Werther is still regularly performed around the world and has been recorded many times. Although the role of Werther was written for a tenor, Massenet adjusted it for a baritone, when Mattia Battistini sang it in Saint Petersburg in 1902. It is very occasionally performed in this version, in which the changes affect only the vocal line for the title character. There are no other changes to the words, to the lines for other characters, or to the orchestration.

Roles

Instrumentation
2 flutes (2nd doubling piccolo),
2 oboes (doubling English horns),
2 clarinets in B-flat and A,
alto saxophone,
2 bassoons,
4 horns in F,
2 cornets in B-flat and A,
3 trombones,
tuba,
timpani,
percussion (1) (bass drum, triangle),
harp,
strings.

Synopsis
Time: Within the period July to December, in an undefined year in the 1780s.
Place: Wetzlar in Germany.

Act 1
In July, the widowed Bailiff (a Magistrate, rather than one who comes to seize property), is teaching his six youngest children a Christmas carol ("Noël! Jésus vient de naître"). His drinking companions, Johann and Schmidt, arrive as Charlotte, the eldest daughter, dresses for a ball. Since her fiancé Albert is away, she is to be escorted by Werther, whom the Bailiff and his companions find gloomy. Werther arrives ("O Nature, pleine de grâce"), and watches as Charlotte prepares her young siblings' supper, just as her mother had before she died. He greets her and they leave for the ball. Albert returns unexpectedly after a six-month trip. He is unsure of Charlotte's intentions and disappointed not to find her at home, but is reassured and consoled by Charlotte's younger sister Sophie. He leaves after promising to return in the morning. After an orchestral interlude, Werther and Charlotte return very late; he is already enamoured of her. His declaration of love is interrupted by the announcement of Albert's return. Charlotte recalls how she promised her dying mother she would marry Albert. Werther is in despair.

Act 2
It is three months later, and Charlotte and Albert are now married. They walk happily to church to celebrate the minister's 50th wedding anniversary, followed by the disconsolate Werther ("Un autre est son époux!"). First Albert and then Sophie ("Du gai soleil, plein de flamme") try to cheer him up. When Charlotte exits the church, he speaks to her of their first meeting. Charlotte begs Werther to leave her, though she indicates that she would be willing to receive him again on Christmas Day. Werther contemplates suicide ("Lorsque l'enfant revient d'un voyage"). He encounters Sophie but the tearful girl does not understand his distressing behavior. Albert now realizes that Werther loves Charlotte.

Act 3

Charlotte is at home alone on Christmas Eve. She spends time rereading the letters that she has received from Werther ("Werther! Qui m'aurait dit ... Ces lettres!"), wondering how the young poet is and how she had the strength to send him away. Sophie comes in and tries to cheer up her older sister ("Ah! le rire est béni"), though Charlotte is not to be consoled ("Va! laisse couler mes larmes"). Suddenly Werther appears, and while he reads to her some poetry of Ossian ("Pourquoi me réveiller?"), he realizes that she does indeed return his love. They embrace for a moment, but she quickly bids him farewell. He leaves with thoughts of suicide. Albert returns home to find his wife distraught. Werther sends a messenger to Albert, requesting to borrow his pistols, explaining he is going on an extended trip. After the servant has taken them, Charlotte has a terrible premonition and hurries to find Werther. An orchestral intermezzo ("La nuit de Noël") leads without a break into the final Act.

Act 4
"The death of Werther": At Werther's apartment, Charlotte has arrived too late to stop him from shooting himself; he is dying. She consoles him by declaring her love. He asks for forgiveness. After he dies, Charlotte faints. Outside children are heard singing the Christmas carol.

Noted arias

Act 1
Werther: "O Nature, pleine de grâce"
Act 2
Werther: "Un autre est son époux!"
Sophie: "Du gai soleil, plein de flamme"
Werther: "Lorsque l'enfant revient d'un voyage"

Act 3
Charlotte: "Werther! Qui m'aurait dit /Ces lettres!" (Letter Scene)
Charlotte: "Va! laisse couler mes larmes"
Werther: "Pourquoi me réveiller?"

Recordings

A well-regarded recording of the complete opera was made in January 1931 by French Columbia with a French cast and the orchestra and chorus of the Opéra-Comique under the direction of Élie Cohen. Henry Fogel of Fanfare magazine, writing in 1992, counted 14 complete recordings and considered it the finest of the lot. His colleague, James Camner, reviewing the Opera d'Oro reissue in 2003, called it "one of the treasures of recorded opera. ... Unfortunately, the transfer is over filtered. The high frequencies are lost, giving the performance an unwarranted flatness. Happily, Naxos offers the same recording expertly transferred by Ward Marston, and acquiring it is a must." Alan Blyth, while giving a very positive review of the reissue of the recording with Albert Lance as Werther and Rita Gorr as Charlotte in 2004, nevertheless pointed out that "neither quite has the ideal subtlety of the best Massenet singers, such as Vallin and Thill on the classic, pre-war set, now on Naxos".

In addition, many of the greatest French and Italian singers of the past century or more have recorded individual arias from Massenet's masterwork.

References
Notes

Further reading

External links 
 
 Werther: Full orchestral score, indiana.edu
 Werther : drame lyrique en quatre actes et cinq tableaux (d'apres Goethe), 1893 publication, French, digitization by BYU on archive.org

Operas based on works by Johann Wolfgang von Goethe
Operas by Jules Massenet
French-language operas
1892 operas
Operas
Operas set in Germany
Operas based on novels
Works based on The Sorrows of Young Werther